The Ohio State Sports Network from Learfield is an American radio network consisting of 62 radio stations which carry coverage of Ohio State Buckeyes football and men's basketball. Co-owned WBNS and WBNS-FM, both licensed to Columbus, Ohio, serve as the network's 2 flagship stations. The network also includes 60 affiliates in the U.S. states of Ohio and West Virginia: 33 AM stations, 22 of which extend their signals with low-power FM translators; 26 full-power FM stations; and one HD Radio digital subchannel which supplements its signal with a low-power FM translator. Paul Keels has served as play-by-play announcer for both football and men's basketball since 1998; former Ohio State offensive guard Jim Lachey currently serves as color analyst for football; and former Ohio State point guard Ron Stokes currently serves as color analyst for men's basketball.

History

In 2009, Ohio State announced it had sold its athletic program's media rights to IMG College and RadiOhio, Inc. (member of the Dispatch Broadcasting Group and then-owner of longtime network flagships WBNS and WBNS-FM); the "lucrative multiyear deal" was reportedly worth $110 million, and scheduled to last through 2019. At the time of the announcement, athletic director Gene Smith said Ohio State athletics would be in a better position to confront the then-ongoing economic downturn, referencing an unexpected $1.2 million deficit.

On December 31, 2018, Learfield Communications, Inc., and IMG College merged and formed a new company, Learfield IMG College.

Programming
Besides gameday coverage, network programming includes:
 Buckeye Roundtable, a two-hour weekly discussion on Buckeyes football, airs Monday evenings.
The Ryan Day Call-In Show, a weekly season-long update with the football head coach, airs Thursdays at 12pm noon.

Station list

Asterisk (*) indicates HD Radio broadcast.
Blue background indicates low-power FM translator.

Network map(s)

References

External links

IMGCollege.com: Ohio State University

College basketball on the radio in the United States
College football on the radio
Ohio State Buckeyes football
Ohio State Buckeyes men's basketball
Sports radio networks in the United States
2009 establishments in Ohio